Arsenio Meza (born 22 January 1953) is a Paraguayan footballer. He played in four matches for the Paraguay national football team in 1979. He was also part of Paraguay's squad for the 1979 Copa América tournament.

References

1953 births
Living people
Paraguayan footballers
Paraguay international footballers
Place of birth missing (living people)
Association football forwards